The women's uneven bars competition at the 2016 Summer Olympics was held on 14 August at the HSBC Arena.

The medals were presented by Alexander Zhukov, IOC member representing Russia, and Alejandro Peniche, FIG Executive Committee Member.

Competition format
The top 8 qualifiers in the qualification phase (limit two per NOC), based on combined score of each apparatus, advanced to the individual all-around final. The finalists performed on each apparatus again. Qualification scores were then ignored, with only final round scores counting.

Qualification

The gymnasts who ranked top eight qualified for final round. In case of there were more than two gymnasts in same NOC, the last ranked among them would not qualify to final round. The next best ranked gymnast would qualify instead.

Final

References

Women's 

uneven bars
2016
2016 in women's gymnastics
Women's events at the 2016 Summer Olympics